Frederick may refer to:

People
 Frederick (given name), the name

Nobility

Anhalt-Harzgerode
Frederick, Prince of Anhalt-Harzgerode (1613–1670)

Austria
 Frederick I, Duke of Austria (Babenberg), Duke of Austria from 1195 to 1198
 Frederick II, Duke of Austria (1219–1246), last Duke of Austria from the Babenberg dynasty
 Frederick the Fair (Frederick I of Austria (Habsburg), 1286–1330), Duke of Austria and King of the Romans

Baden
 Frederick I, Grand Duke of Baden (1826–1907), Grand Duke of Baden
 Frederick II, Grand Duke of Baden (1857–1928), Grand Duke of Baden

Bohemia
 Frederick, Duke of Bohemia (died 1189), Duke of Olomouc and Bohemia

Britain
 Frederick, Prince of Wales (1707–1751), eldest son of King George II of Great Britain

Brandenburg/Prussia
 Frederick I, Elector of Brandenburg (1371–1440), also known as Frederick VI, Burgrave of Nuremberg
 Frederick II, Elector of Brandenburg (1413–1470), Margrave of Brandenburg
 Frederick William, Elector of Brandenburg (1620–1688), Duke of Prussia
 Frederick I of Prussia (1657–1713), Elector of Brandenburg
 Frederick II of Prussia (1712–1786), King of Prussia, Frederick the Great
 Frederick III, German Emperor (Frederick III of Prussia, 1831–1888), German emperor and King of Prussia
 Frederick William I of Prussia (1688–1740), King of Prussia
 Frederick William II of Prussia (1744–1797), King of Prussia
 Frederick William III of Prussia (1770–1840), King of Prussia
 Frederick William IV of Prussia (1795–1861), King of Prussia

Denmark
 Frederick I of Denmark (1471–1533), King of Denmark and Norway
 Frederick II of Denmark (1534–1588), King of Denmark and Norway
 Frederick III of Denmark (1609–1670), King of Denmark and Norway
 Frederick IV of Denmark (1671–1730), King of Denmark and Norway
 Frederick V of Denmark (1723–1766), King of Denmark and Norway
 Frederick VI of Denmark (1768–1839), King of Denmark and Norway
 Frederick VII of Denmark (1808–1863), King of Denmark
 Frederick VIII of Denmark (1843–1912), King of Denmark
 Frederick IX of Denmark (1899–1972), King of Denmark
 Frederik, Crown Prince of Denmark (born 1968), Crown Prince of Denmark
 Frederik Raben-Levetzau (1850–1933), Danish count and politician

Holy Roman Empire
 Frederick I, Holy Roman Emperor (1125–1190), king & emperor
 Frederick II, Holy Roman Emperor (1196–1250), king & emperor
 Frederick III, Holy Roman Emperor (1415–1493), German ruler

Mantua
 Federico I Gonzaga, Marquess of Mantua
 Federico II Gonzaga, Duke of Mantua

Naples
 Frederick of Naples (1452–1504), King of Naples

Nuremberg
 Frederick III, Burgrave of Nuremberg (c. 1220–1297)
 Frederick IV, Burgrave of Nuremberg (1287–1332)
 Frederick V, Burgrave of Nuremberg (died 1398)

Palatinate
 Frederick IV, Elector Palatine (1574–1610), German aristocrat
 Frederick V of the Palatinate (1619–1620), Bohemian aristocrat

Saxony
 Frederick III, Elector of Saxony (1463–1525), known as Frederick the Wise
 Frederick Augustus I of Saxony (1750–1827), Elector and King of Saxony
 Frederick Augustus II of Saxony (1797–1854), King of Saxony
 Frederick Augustus III of Saxony (1865–1932), King of Saxony

Sweden
 Frederick I of Sweden (1676–1751), King of Sweden

Württemberg
 Frederick I of Württemberg (1754–1816), Duke, Elector, and King of Württemberg

Other people

Given name
 Frederick Banting (1891–1941), Canadian doctor who co-discovered insulin
 Fredrick de Silva (1912–1993), Sri Lankan lawyer and politician
 Fred Dibnah (1938–2004), English steeplejack and television personality
 Frederick Douglass (1818–1891), American abolitionist, editor, orator, author, statesman and reformer
 Frederick Augustus Forbes (1818–1878), Australian politician
 Frederick Forsyth (born 1938), British novelist
 Freddy Stephen Fuller, Canadian ex-amateur boxer 666
 Fred Hollows (1929–1993), Australian ophthalmologist and philanthropist
 Frederick Pei Li (born 1940), American physician and co-discoverer of Li-Fraumeni syndrome
 Frederik Magle (born 1977), Danish composer
 Frederick Norris (1921–2006), British marathon runner
 Frederick de la Roche (died 1173), the sixth Latin archbishop of Tyre
 Frederick Segura (born 1979), Venezuelan track and road cyclist
 Frederick Skiff (1867–1947), American author, collector and bibliophile
 Fred "Sonic" Smith (1949–1994), guitarist of American rock band MC5
 Frederick Varley (1881–1969), painter
 Frederik (singer), (1945), stage name of Finnish singer Ilkka Juhani Sysimetsä, also known as Reetu

Surname
 Dave Frederick, American sportswriter and coach

Middle name
 Sabrina Frederick-Traub (born 1996), Australian rules footballer

Fictional people 
 Frederick (Animal Farm), the owner of Pinchfield Farm in the novel by George Orwell
 Frederick Gaylord Crane, fictional child of Lilith and Frasier Crane on the American TV shows "Cheers" and "Frasier"
 Emperor Frederick, the evil emperor in the Dune II game

Places

United States
 Frederick, Colorado, a town in Weld County
 Frederick, Kansas, a town
 Frederick County, Maryland
 Frederick, Maryland, a city in Frederick County
 Frederick, Michigan, a ghost town
 Frederick, Ohio, an unincorporated community
 Frederick, Oklahoma, a city in Tillman County
 Frederick, South Dakota, a town in Brown County
 Frederick County, Virginia
 Frederick Creek (disambiguation), several streams
 Frederick Sound, a sound in Alaska

Canada
 Frederick, Ontario
 Frederick Sound (Canada), a sound in British Columbia

Other uses 
 Frederic (band), a Japanese rock band from Kobe
 Frederick (fictional character), the mouse protagonist of the eponymous 1968 children's book by Leo Lionni
 Frederick (horse), a racehorse
 , several ships
 "Frederick" (song) by Patti Smith

See also 
 Frederic (disambiguation)
 Federico
 Fred (disambiguation)
 Freddie (disambiguation)
 Freddy (disambiguation)
 Frédéric
 Frederico
 Fredrik
 Fredro
 Friedrich (disambiguation)
 Fryderyk (given name)

English masculine given names